Waypoint Centre for Mental Health Care (French: Waypoint Centre de soins de santé mentale) formerly known as Mental Health Centre Penetanguishene, is a 301-bed specialty mental health hospital located on the shores of Georgian Bay in the Town of Penetanguishene, approximately  north of Toronto. 

Waypoint provides both acute and longer-term psychiatric inpatient and outpatient services to Simcoe County, part of Dufferin County and Muskoka and the southern part of Parry Sound. 

Waypoint is the region's only specialty mental and addiction health hospital and the province's only high secure forensic mental health program for clients served by both the mental health and justice systems.

History 
The original 380-acre site was chosen by Governor John Graves Simcoe as the naval and military base to protect the Upper Great Lakes from American threats in the aftermath of War of 1812, until it was decommissioned in 1855.

The Boys Reformatory of Upper Canada was established in the abandoned barracks in 1859, however the buildings were destroyed by fire in 1870. A new building was constructed, which is now known as the Administration Building. The stones from the old barracks were used as a foundation and the new stone was taken from Quarry Island in Severn Sound. The Administration Building is the oldest building on the grounds and is one of several registered historical sites.

In 1904 the Boys Reformatory was phased out and the building was converted into an “asylum for the insane.” 

Expansion came over the years, including building Oak Ridge in 1933. During this time the name was changed to Ontario Hospital, and in 1967 Brebeuf and Bayfield buildings opened, designed as apartment-style living quarters to simulate life in the community. 

Around 1970, the number of patients in residence at the hospital reached a historical high of about 650. In 1969, the name was changed again to the Mental Health Centre and construction began on the Toanche Building. 

In 2008, the hospital was divested from the Ministry of Health and Long-Term Care to a public hospital corporation, sponsored by the Catholic Health Corporation of Ontario which is a health care sponsoring agency of the Catholic Church. 

In 2011, the hospital changed its name again, this time to Waypoint Centre for Mental Health Care.

Oak Ridge 
In 1933, the first four wards of Oak Ridge were constructed. Originally intended to provide custodial care to the “criminally insane”, Oak Ridge was the only institution of its kind in Canada at the time. Since patients rarely moved on in the early days, a second construction of four wards was added to Oak Ridge in the mid-1950s, bringing the patient capacity to 300.

In March 2007, the Ontario Government included funding to replace the aging Oak Ridge Building in its budget. In 2010, early works construction for the new building began, and in spring of 2014, the Atrium building opened its doors to patients from Oak Ridge and Brebeuf.

Atrium Building 
The Atrium Building opened in 2014. 

The building is built on the hospital’s existing site, and replaced the 160-bed Oak Ridge building and the 20-bed Brebeuf building, offering a larger space for treatment and care for people with mental illness who are involved with a justice system.

Notable Patients
Jeffrey Arenburg (1956-2017), murderer of Brian Smith; released in 2006
Russell Maurice Johnson (born 1947), serial killer
Mathew Charles Lamb (1948-1976), spree killer; was remanded in Waypoint for 30 days
Peter Woodcock (1939-2010), serial killer and rapist

References

www.waypointcentre.ca

External links
Official website

Hospital buildings completed in 1904
Psychiatric hospitals in Ontario
Hospitals in Simcoe County